Antifer is an extinct genus of large herbivorous deer of the family Cervidae, endemic to South America during the Pleistocene, living from 2.6 Ma to 13,000 years ago and existing for approximately . Cervids first entered the formerly isolated continent of South America during the Pliocene as part of the Great American Biotic Interchange.

It would have been preyed upon by the dire wolf, the fox-like Theriodictis, saber-toothed cats, short-faced bears and various other predators, including humans.

Taxonomy 
Antifer was named by Ameghino (1889) based on Captain Antifer in a Jules Verne novel describing his voyage of discovery in the Southern Hemisphere. It was assigned to Cervidae by Carroll (1988).

Fossil distribution 
The fossil remains are confined to southern Brazil, the Sopas Formation of Uruguay, central Chile and Argentina. It is known mostly from large, non-palmated shed antlers.

References 

Capreolinae
Prehistoric deer
Prehistoric even-toed ungulate genera
Pliocene even-toed ungulates
Pleistocene even-toed ungulates
Piacenzian first appearances
Pleistocene genus extinctions
Pleistocene mammals of South America
Lujanian
Ensenadan
Uquian
Pleistocene Argentina
Fossils of Argentina
Pleistocene Brazil
Fossils of Brazil
Pleistocene Chile
Fossils of Chile
Pleistocene Uruguay
Fossils of Uruguay
Fossil taxa described in 1889
Taxa named by Florentino Ameghino